Oyonnax station (French: Gare d'Oyonnax) is a railway station served by TER Auvergne-Rhône-Alpes. It serves the town of Oyonnax, and is located in the department of Ain. The station is located on the line between Andelot-en-Montagne and La Cluse.

History
Approval to construct a station at the current site was given by a ministerial decision date 17 November 1880. Construction took place between 28 March 1883 and 16 May 1885, and the station was opened by the Minister of Public Works on 17 May 1885.

Work on the Ligne du Haut-Bugey has caused buses to replace trains between Bourg-en-Bresse and Oyonnax from 2005 to December 2012.

Services

The following services serve the station as of 2022:
regional trains Lyon - Bourg-en-Bresse - Brion-Montréal-la-Cluse - Oyonnax
regional buses to Saint-Claude, Nantua and Bourg-en-Bresse

See also 

 List of SNCF stations in Auvergne-Rhône-Alpes

References

External links
 
 Practical information regarding Oyonnax station, TER Auvergne-Rhône-Alpes.

Railway stations in Ain
Railway stations in France opened in 1885